The Career Enrichment Center (CEC), is an Albuquerque Public Schools Magnet High School. Its full name is the Charles R. Spain Career Enrichment Center, named in honor of a former Superintendent of Albuquerque Public Schools.  The name means that the curriculum prepares high school students for actual careers in very specific ways.  The school provides specialized Science, Technology and Vocational classes for students from all APS High Schools. It also has its own specialized high school and associate degree program. This program is called the Early College Academy, or ECA, and is a cooperation between CEC and Central New Mexico Community College.

Course offerings
There are a wide variety of opportunities offered by CEC.

Classes include 

 Chinese - Mandarin Chinese is an official language of the United Nations of Earth and currently spoken, read and written by over a billion people, mostly in Asia.  Chinese has become an ever more important language for business and industry leaders in the West.  Numerous internationally renowned literary works of both the ancient past and the modern era are written in Mandarin Chinese.  As culture and language directly impact each other, some cultural and historical aspects of the modern People's Republic of China are studied as well.  The class instructs students in reading, writing and speaking of Mandarin Chinese.
 Japanese - Japanese remains a widely spoken language throughout the Imperial State of Japan as well as certain surrounding areas.  Japan remains a highly developed nation of the G8 and very influential on the world stage.  As culture and language impact each other, some cultural and historical aspects of the modern Imperial State of Japan are studied as well.  The written form uses three styles:  hiragana, katakana and kanji syllabary character sets.  The class instructs students in reading, writing and speaking of Japanese.
 Navajo - Navajo is the official language of the Navajo Nation, the very largest indigenous First Nations reservation on the North American continent, occupying substantial portions of New Mexico, Arizona and Utah.  Navajo is a living modern language and one of considerable complexity.  A coded form of Navajo was used as communications by the United States Marine Corps during World War 2, and never compromised.  The tribe's government conducts all of their official oral discussions in their capital city of Window Rock, Arizona, in the Dine (Navajo) language.  The class instructs students in reading, writing and speaking of the Dine (Navajo) language.
 German - Germany is currently the largest nation-state in the European Union, and German is spoken by many people in Germany, Austria, Holland, Switzerland and other surrounding lands.  Numerous historical sources and classic literary works, as well as a very substantial amount of music, are written in German.  As culture and language impact each other, some cultural and historical aspects of the modern Federated German Republic are studied as well.  The class instructs students in reading, writing and speaking of modern German.
 French - French is an official language of the United Nations of Earth, a well-known Romance language, and a language in which numerous historical sources and classic literary works both are written and continue to be written.  As culture and language directly impact each other, some cultural and historical aspects of the modern Fifth Republic of France are studied as well.  The class instructs students in reading, writing and speaking of modern French.
 Zuni - Zuni is the language of New Mexico's currently largest (~10,000 residents) native American Pueblo ("village") located near the Navajo Nation and the New Mexico/Arizona state line.  The language is truly distinct from all of the other Puebloan languages anywhere else.  Students need permission for this class
 Architectural and Construction Engineering - This course connects to the University of New Mexico Department of Civil Engineering in the Farris Schools of Engineering and their School of Architecture and Planning.  Students may be expected to perform undergraduate college level work by the end of the course.
 Astronomy - (Fall semester only) Astronomy literally teaches students their place in the universe, covering topics of our solar system, its star, planets, moons, asteroids and comets; the Milky Way Galaxy and all of its stars and recently discovered solar systems; the overall evolution of the universe from the Big Bang to the present; and the space exploration programs of humankind and their history.  The on-site planetarium is one key resource in addition to telescopes, globes, maps, star charts, H-R diagrams, etc.  Students must complete Algebra I and Chemistry I prior to enrollment.  This course meets science curriculum credit requirements for New Mexico high school graduation.
 Automotive Technician (I, II, III)
 AP Calculus BC - this class is designed to help students pass the AP Calculus BC Examination designed and scored by the College Board.  A basic knowledge of differentiation and integration, trigonometry (including all key identities), and advanced algebra are required to succeed in this course.  Calculus is critical to careers in engineering, mathematics, science and some business endeavors.  Class requires tutoring sessions outside regular hours.  The course meets mathematics curriculum credit requirements for New Mexico high school graduation.
 Construction Careers and Construction Internship
 Computer Application Development (formerly Computer Science I) - this class is designed to help students pass the AP Computer Science Examination designed and scored by the College Board.  The programming language used is the standardized Java compiler in the corresponding run-time environment.  The course teaches the object-oriented programming (OOP) paradigm and requires some mastery of fundamental algebra and logical principles in order to succeed.
 Cosmetology - Students in this course gain significant practical experience which they can apply toward earning a New Mexico Cosmetology License.
 Certified Nursing Assistant
  Digital Media: Film, Audio and Animation
  EMT
  Police Service Aide Program
 Electronics Engineering - this class teaches students about direct current, alternating current, analog electronics, digital electronics, and several other ways in which electricity has been harnessed to accomplish numerous goals from the most fundamentally simple to the most challengingly complex.  Students will work with actual circuit boards, oscilloscopes, digital logic analyzers, and other forms of electrical equipment to build and test devices.
The course is connected to another course at the school, Robotics.
 Forensics
 Landscape Design for the Southwest
 Mentorships and Internships - Mentorships and Internships provide a direct and immediate pathway to numerous career opportunity workplace exposures.  They allow both the intern and employer to determine fairly quickly how good the workplace "fit" is for each student enrolled in this program.  Successful students from this program made a transition to paid part-time and full-time employment in a variety of professional fields of endeavor.
 Money, Success & Power (Economics and Business Law)
 AP Physics C - Advanced Placement (AP) Physics is designed to help students pass the AP Physics C Examination designed and scored by the College Board.  A satisfactory score on the test grants specific college credits in physics.  The AP version of physics requires calculus to accomplish the course goals, and therefore students are required to enter the course with Calculus I as either a prerequisite or co-requisite.  Physics is critical to certain careers in engineering, mathematics, science and technology.  The course meets science curriculum credit requirements for New Mexico high school graduation.
 Pre-Med and Advanced Pre-Medical Techniques - While medical school has a known reputation for being difficult both to enter and to complete, this curriculum gives capable students an excellent "head start."  Human anatomy and physiology are studied in depth and detail, and all primary organs and systems of the human body are studied in this class.  The class is updated annually to reflect the latest developments in American medical art and science.
 Twice Exceptional Math and English classes for Freshmen and Sophomores
 Veterinary Medicine - Veterinary Medicine provides students with practical experience in animal cadaver dissection/necropsy, focused study of animal anatomy and physiology, along with exposure to current research on animal behavior, husbandry and pet care.
 Web Scripting - Web Scripting allows students to perform basic design and programming of pieces of World Wide Web sites almost immediately, something the entire world began doing shortly after the invention of the World Wide Web in 1993.

Early College Academy
This is a college preparatory program and is a school itself within CEC. Students take classes at CEC in the morning and in the afternoon take classes at CNM for dual credit as both college and high-school classes.

Practical Nursing Program
CEC offers an ACEN accredited Practical Nursing program, founded in 1983 for which High School Sophomores may apply. All High School Sophomores enrolled in an APS school who meet the requirements are eligible to apply. The application process is fairly rigorous and includes testing and interview stages, of nearly 300 applicants 50-60 students are accepted. Once accepted students will spend 5 semesters, including some time in the summers working to further their knowledge of medical care. The program has an average attrition rate of 50% associated to course difficulty and high standards, students must attain an average of 75% each semester to continue through the program. Students take classes and also receive experience with various healthcare facilities and care providers around the Albuquerque area. Throughout the program students will attain over 1300 hours of theory and 500 hours of clinical. After completing the program students are able to take the NCLEX-PN and attempt to receive status to practice as Licensed Practical Nurse. The program has had passing rates above 90% for first time test takers for the past 10 years. The CEC PN program is well respected among the Albuquerque healthcare community.

Program Student Learning Outcomes 

 Professionalism
 Nursing Process
 Caring
 Communication

References

High schools in Albuquerque, New Mexico
Public high schools in New Mexico
Magnet schools in New Mexico
Nursing schools in New Mexico